Kinnal  also called Kinhal is a village in the southern state of Karnataka, India. It is located in the Koppal taluk of Koppal district in Karnataka. This village is famous for Kinnal Craft. Recently this Craft has been granted Geographical Indication and its GI tag number is 159.

Demographics
As of the 2001 India census, Kinhal had a population of 8873 with 4480 males and 4393 females.

Transport
There are buses from Koppal town to Kinnal Village on regular basis. Nearest major town is Koppal. From Koppal one catch buses and trains to other places.

See also
Hampi
Anegondi
Kuknur
Kanakagiri
Yelburga
Karatagi
Kushtagi
Koppal
Karnataka

References

External links
 https://web.archive.org/web/20190810051205/https://koppal.nic.in/

 

Villages in Koppal district